John Daniel Matuszak (October 25, 1950 – June 17, 1989) was an American football defensive end in the National Football League (NFL) who later became an actor.

Matuszak was the first overall pick in the 1973 NFL Draft and played most of his career with the Oakland Raiders until he retired after winning his second Super Bowl in 1981. He participated in the 1978 World's Strongest Man competition, where he placed ninth. As an actor, Matuszak played in both films and television, appearing first as O.W. Shaddock in 1979 in North Dallas Forty followed by Tonda in the 1981 film Caveman and the deformed Sloth in the 1985 movie The Goonies. His biography, Cruisin' with the Tooz, written with Steve Delsohn, was published in 1987.

Early life
Matuszak was born in Milwaukee, Wisconsin, to Audrey and Marvin Matuszak. He had two brothers, but both died of cystic fibrosis at young ages. His one sister also had the disease. The family moved from downtown Milwaukee to Oak Creek, Wisconsin, where Matuszak's classmates ridiculed him as a gawky beanpole. Matuszak was always big for his age, which became an advantage as a defensive lineman in football. He attended Oak Creek High School.

After a freshman year playing football at Fort Dodge Junior College in Iowa, Matuszak was recruited to the University of Missouri by Dan Devine. Matuszak enrolled at Mizzou for his sophomore year of college, where he played one season of football for the Tigers as a tight end. Matuszak did not see much playing time at Mizzou because the starting tight end was an excellent blocker. With Dan Devine leaving Missouri for the Green Bay Packers that same year, Matuszak no longer had a spot on the team, and his scholarship was revoked by new coach Al Onofrio. Following his sophomore season at Mizzou, Matuszak transferred to the University of Tampa, where he became the star of their football team. Matuszak was selected to the All American Team 1972. He was also a member of the Sigma Phi Epsilon fraternity.

In Matuszak's last college football game, Tampa defeated Kent State 21-18 in the Tangerine Bowl. Kent State's standouts included future Hall of Fame linebacker Jack Lambert and Gary Pinkel, who coached Missouri from 2001-15. Another Golden Flashes senior, future six-time national championship coach Nick Saban, suffered a season-ending injury in October. Kent State's coach was Don James, who went on to win the 1991 national championship at Washington.

Professional athlete
Matuszak was the first pick of the 1973 NFL Draft, selected by the Houston Oilers. In addition to his contract with the Oilers, he joined the Houston Texans of the World Football League (WFL), playing a total of seven plays before a restraining order was served to him during a game, barring him from playing for two teams at the same time. Matuszak said he had no plans to play in that game but requested to play after seeing 25 or so men looking for him on the sidelines. He didn't know what was happening at the time and wanted to avoid confrontation. The displeased Oilers traded him to the Kansas City Chiefs for Curley Culp, another player who had threatened to jump to the WFL, and a first-round draft choice in 1975 on October 22, 1974. The trade was a steal for Houston, where Culp became a Hall of Fame performer when coach Bum Phillips moved Culp to nose tackle in the 3-4 defense in 1975. In 1976, the Kansas City Chiefs traded Matuszak to the Washington Redskins but he was released by the Redskins soon after. Later that year, as a free agent, Matuszak signed with the Raiders. He helped them win two Super Bowls (XI and XV), before retiring after spending the entire 1982 season on injured reserve.

Matuszak's football career was often overshadowed by his lifestyle. In his autobiography, he stated that he used drugs and abused alcohol while playing professional football. An article written for Sports Illustrateds website in January 2005 named him one of the top five all-time "bad boys" of the NFL.

Matuszak was the only one of the first six selections of the 1973 draft to never earn first-team All-Pro honors. Alabama guard John Hannah, selected fourth by the New England Patriots, was inducted into the Hall of Fame in 1991, his first year of eligibility, following a 13-year career, while quarterback Bert Jones (Baltimore Colts), offensive tackle Jerry Sisemore, tight end Charle Young (Philadelphia Eagles), and defensive tackle Dave Butz (St. Louis Cardinals) were all prominent throughout the rest of the 1970s and into the 1980s.

Actor
Matuszak acted professionally in the 1980s, making appearances in feature films and on television, often portraying football players or gentle giants.  His first major role was in the 1979 movie North Dallas Forty as a football player. He appeared in the movies Caveman, The Ice Pirates, One Man Force, and One Crazy Summer, but is frequently remembered as deformed captive Sloth in The Goonies, the make-up for which took five hours to apply. Matuszak's character Sloth wears an Oakland Raiders shirt in some scenes. He had numerous guest appearances in TV shows such as Perfect Strangers, M*A*S*H, The Dukes of Hazzard, Hunter, Silver Spoons, The A-Team, 1st & Ten and Miami Vice.

Death
Matuszak died on June 17, 1989, as a result of acute propoxyphene intoxication, an accidental overdose of the prescription drug Darvocet, according to the findings of the Los Angeles County Coroner's Office. He was 38 years old. The report also said that hypertrophic cardiomyopathy (an enlarged heart) and bronchopneumonia had been contributing factors in his death. There were also traces of cocaine found in his bloodstream.

Filmography

References
John Matuszak and Steve Delsohn. Cruisin' with the Tooz. 1987. .

External links

1950 births
1989 deaths
20th-century American male actors
Accidental deaths in California
American football defensive ends
American football defensive tackles
American male film actors
American male television actors
American people of Polish descent
American strength athletes
Drug-related deaths in California
Houston Oilers players
Houston Texans (WFL) players
Kansas City Chiefs players
Los Angeles Raiders players
Missouri Tigers football players
National Football League first-overall draft picks
Oakland Raiders players
People from Oak Creek, Wisconsin
Players of American football from Milwaukee
Tampa Spartans football players
Washington Redskins players